The Serbian Chess Championship is held by the Serbian Chess Association.

The first championships were played in 1935 and until 1991 they were the Yugoslav Chess Championship.  In 1992 FR Yugoslavia was formed, which changed its name to Serbia and Montenegro in 2003, and the Serbia and Montenegro Chess Championship was played until 2006, when Montenegro left the state union and a Serbian and Montenegrin separate championships were formed.

Winners list (Men) 

{| class="sortable wikitable"
! No. !! Year !! Champion
|-
| 1 || 2007 || Miloš Perunović
|-
| 2 || 2008 || Ivan Ivanišević
|-
| 3 || 2009 || Ivan Ivanišević
|-
| 4 || 2010 || Nikola Sedlak
|-
| 5 || 2011 || Ivan Ivanišević
|-
| 6 || 2012 || Ivan Ivanišević
|-
| 7 || 2013 || Boban Bogosavljević
|-
| 8 || 2014 || Aleksandar Inđić
|-
| 9 || 2015 ||  Dejan Antić
|-
| 10 || 2016 ||  Miroslav Marković
|-
| 11 || 2017 || Ivan Ivanišević
|-
| 12 || 2018 || Aleksandar Inđić
|-
| 13 || 2019 || Ivan Ivanišević
|-
| 14 || 2020 || Aleksandar Inđić
|-
| 15 || 2021 || Velimir Ivić
|-
| 16 || 2022 || Velimir Ivić
|}

Winners list (Women) 

{| class="sortable wikitable"
! No. !! Year !! Champion
|-
| 1 || 2007 || Anđelija Stojanović
|-
| 2 || 2008 || Anđelija Stojanović
|-
| 3 || 2009 || Sandra Đukić
|-
| 4 || 2010 || Anđelija Stojanović
|-
| 5 || 2011 || Jovana Erić
|-
| 6 || 2012 || Marija Rakić
|-
| 7 || 2013 || Maria Manakova
|-
| 8 || 2014 ||  Jovana Vojinović
|-
| 9 || 2015 ||  Marija Rakić
|-
| 10 || 2016 || Ljilja Drljević 
|-
| 11 || 2017 || Adela Velikić
|-
| 12 || 2018 || Teodora Injac
|-
| 13 || 2019 || Teodora Injac
|-
| 14 || 2020 || Teodora Injac
|}

Crosstable

{| class="wikitable" style="text-align: center;"
|+ Serbian Women Chess Championship 6th Kać 2012
!   !! Player !! Rating !! 1 !! 2 !! 3 !! 4 !! 5 !! 6 !! 7 !! 8 !! 9 !! 0 !! 11 !! 12 !! Points !! TB
|-
| 1 || align=left|          ||2267     ||*|| 1|| 1|| ½|| ½|| ½|| 0|| 1|| ½|| 1|| 1|| 1||   8.0  ||  
|-
| 2 || align=left|  ||2324     ||0|| *|| 1|| 1|| 0|| ½|| ½|| 1|| ½|| 1|| 1|| 1||   7.5  ||36.25

|-
| 3 || align=left|        ||2315     ||0|| 0|| *|| ½|| ½|| 1|| 1|| ½|| 1|| 1|| 1|| 1||   7.5  ||34.00
 
|-
| 4 || align=left|           ||2243     ||½|| 0|| ½|| *|| ½|| 1|| ½|| ½|| ½|| 1|| 1|| 1||   7.0  || 
|-
| 5 || align=left|     ||2227     ||½|| 1|| ½|| ½|| *|| ½|| ½|| ½|| ½|| 0|| 1|| 1||   6.5  || 
|-
| 6 || align=left|       ||2278     ||½|| ½|| 0|| 0|| ½|| *|| ½|| ½|| ½|| 1|| 1|| 1||   6.0  || 
|-
| 7 || align=left|          ||2294     ||1|| ½|| 0|| ½|| ½|| ½|| *|| ½|| 1|| 0|| ½|| ½||   5.5  || 
|-
| 8 || align=left|     ||2263     ||0|| 0|| ½|| ½|| ½|| ½|| ½|| *|| 0|| ½|| ½|| 1||   4.5  || 
|-
| 9 || align=left|         ||2203     ||½|| ½|| 0|| ½|| ½|| ½|| 0|| 1|| *|| 0|| 0|| ½||   4.0  ||
|- 
| 10 || align=left|         ||1876     ||0|| 0|| 0|| 0|| 1|| 0|| 1|| ½|| 1|| *|| 0|| 0||   3.5  ||
|-
| 11 || align=left|      ||1967     ||0|| 0|| 0|| 0|| 0|| 0|| ½|| ½|| 1|| 1|| *|| 0||   3.0  ||12.50
|-
| 12 || align=left|     ||1900     ||0|| 0|| 0|| 0|| 0|| 0|| ½|| 0|| ½|| 1|| 1|| *||   3.0  ||11.25
|}

{| class="wikitable" style="text-align: center;"
|+ Serbian Women Chess Championship 5th Belgrade 2011
!   !! Player !! Rating !! 1 !! 2 !! 3 !! 4 !! 5 !! 6 !! 7 !! 8 !! 9 !! 0 !! 11 !! 12 !! Points !! TB
|-
| 1 || align=left|	 ||2230		||*	||½	||½	||½	||1	||1	||1	||1	||½	||1	||1	||1	||9.0||
|-
| 2 || align=left|||2318	 	||½	||*	||0	||½	||½	||1	||1	||1	||1	||1	||1	||1	||8.5||
|-
| 3 || align=left|	 ||2336	  	||½	||1	||*	||1	||1	||0	||½	||0	||1	||1	||1	||1	||8.0||
|-
| 4 || align=left|	 ||2305	  	||½	||½	||0	||*	||½	||½	||½	||1	||1	||1	||1	||1	||7.5||	32.50
	
|-
| 5 || align=left|	 ||2295	  	||0	||½	||0	||½	||*	||½	||1	||1	||1	||1	||1	||1	||7.5||	30.75
	
|-
| 6 || align=left|	 ||2314		||0	||0	||1	||½	||½	||*	||0	||½	||1	||0	||1	||1	||5.5||	24.25
	
|-
| 7 || align=left|	 ||2203	 	||0	||0	||½	||½	||0	||1	||*	||½	||0	||1	||1	||1	||5.5||	21.00
	
|-
| 8 || align=left|	 ||2309		||0	||0	||1	||0	||0	||½	||½	||*	||½	||1	||1	||1	||5.5||	20.50
|- 
| 9 || align=left|	 ||2086	  	||½	||0	||0	||0	||0	||0	||1	||½	||*	||0	||1	||1	||4.0||	
|-
| 10 || align=left|	 ||1898		||0	||0	||0	||0	||0	||1	||0	||0	||1	||*	||0	||1	||3.0||	
|-
| 11 || align=left|	 ||1894	 	||0	||0	||0	||0	||0	||0	||0	||0	||0	||1	||*	||0	||1.0||	3.00	
|-
| 12 || align=left|	 ||1985		||0	||0	||0	||0	||0	||0	||0	||0	||0	||0	||1	||*	||1.0||	1.00
|}

{| class="wikitable" style="text-align: center;"
|+ Serbian Women Chess Championship 4th Pančevo 2010
!   !! Player !! Rating !! 1 !! 2 !! 3 !! 4 !! 5 !! 6 !! 7 !! 8 !! 9 !! 0 !! 11 !! 12 !! Points !! TB	
|-
| 1 || align=left|||2301	 	||*	||1	||½	||½	||1	||1	||1	||½	||½	||½	||1	||1	||8.5||
|-
| 2 || align=left|	 ||2306	 	||0	||*	||1	||½	||0	||1	||1	||½	||1	||1	||1	||1	||8.0||
|-
| 3 || align=left|	 ||2248	 	||½	||0	||*	||1	||1	||1	||½	||1	||½	||1	||0	||1	||7.5||	39.50
	
|-
| 4 || align=left|	 ||2319	 	||½	||½	||0	||*	||1	||0	||½	||1	||1	||1	||1	||1	||7.5||	34.005	
|-
| 5 || align=left|	 ||2182	 	||0	||1	||0	||0	||*	||½	||1	||1	||1	||½	||1	||½	||6.5||
|-
| 6 || align=left|	 ||2183	 	||0	||0	||0	||1	||½	||*	||½	||½	||1	||1	||1	||½	||6.0||	
|-
| 7 || align=left|	 ||2299		||0	||0	||½	||½	||0	||½	||*	||1	||0	||1	||1	||1	||5.5||	23.00
	
|-
| 8 || align=left|	 ||2214	 	||½	||½	||0	||0	||0	||½	||0	||*	||1	||1	||1	||1	||5.5||	22.25
|-
| 9 || align=left|	 ||2118	 	||½	||0	||½	||0	||0	||0	||1	||0	||*	||½	||½	||1	||4.0||	
|-  
| 10 || align=left|	 ||1883		||½	||0	||0	||0	||½	||0	||0	||0	||½	||*	||1	||½	||3.0||	
|- 
| 11 || align=left|	 ||2038	 	||0	||0	||1	||0	||0	||0	||0	||0	||½	||0	||*	||½	||2.0||	10.50
	
|-
| 12 || align=left|	 ||2152		||0	||0	||0	||0	||½	||½	||0	||0	||0	||½	||½	||*	||2.0||	8.75
|}

References

 Serbian Chess Federation official website
 Serbia at European Chess Union
 sahvrsac.com

Chess national championships
Women's chess national championships
Chess in Serbia
Chess